"Fever" is a song by Norwegian singer Tone Damli from her third studio album Sweet Fever (2007). It was released in Norway on 12 March 2007. The song has peaked to number 6 on the Norwegian Singles Chart.

Track listing

Chart performance

Release history

References

2007 singles
Tone Damli songs
2007 songs